Arantxa Sánchez Vicario defeated Mary Pierce in the final, 6–4, 6–4 to win the women's singles tennis title at the 1994 French Open. Pierce reached the final with the loss of only 10 games.

Steffi Graf was the defending champion, but lost in the semifinals to Pierce.

This tournament marked the first time that former world No. 1 Martina Navratilova lost in the first round of a major since 1976. This was also the last major to feature former world No. 1 Tracy Austin.

Seeds

Qualifying

Draw

Finals

Top half

Section 1

Section 2

Section 3

Section 4

Bottom half

Section 5

Section 6

Section 7

Section 8

External links
1994 French Open – Women's draws and results at the International Tennis Federation

Women's Singles
French Open by year – Women's singles
French Open - Women's Singles
1994 in women's tennis
1994 in French women's sport